Monroe Township is one of the fifteen townships of Putnam County, Ohio, United States.  The 2000 census found 2,234 people in the township, 1,046 of whom lived in the unincorporated portions of the township.

Geography
Located in the northwestern corner of the county, it borders the following townships:
Highland Township, Defiance County - north
Pleasant Township, Henry County - northeast corner
Palmer Township - east
Greensburg Township - southeast corner
Perry Township - south
Brown Township, Paulding County - west
Auglaize Township, Paulding County - northwest corner

The village of Continental is located in southern Monroe Township.

Name and history
Monroe Township was founded in 1852. It is one of twenty-two Monroe Townships statewide.

Government
The township is governed by a three-member board of trustees, who are elected in November of odd-numbered years to a four-year term beginning on the following January 1. Two are elected in the year after the presidential election and one is elected in the year before it. There is also an elected township fiscal officer, who serves a four-year term beginning on April 1 of the year after the election, which is held in November of the year before the presidential election. Vacancies in the fiscal officership or on the board of trustees are filled by the remaining trustees.

References

External links
County website

Townships in Putnam County, Ohio
Townships in Ohio